The men's pole vault event  at the 1989 European Athletics Indoor Championships was held on 19 February.

Results

References

Pole vault at the European Athletics Indoor Championships
Pole